The Very Best of the O'Jays is a compilation album featuring all their greatest hits. It is part of Sony's Playlist album series, which covers 1972 through to 1978, when the O'Jays (and Gamble & Huff) were at the peak of the Charts. Every song on the album has placed somewhere within the Top 20 of the R&B chart, and many of them went to the top of the chart including "Back Stabbers," "Love Train," "For the Love of Money," and "Use ta Be My Girl,"

1998 re-issue
•	Jaimi Vozzi – digital remaster
•	Joe Mac– premastering
•	Frank Tozour – sony editing

References

https://www.allmusic.com/album/the-very-best-of-the-ojays-1998-mw0001054072
 

The O'Jays albums
1998 compilation albums